Odenton is a census-designated place (CDP) in Anne Arundel County, Maryland, United States, located approximately 10–20 minutes from the state capital, Annapolis. The population was 37,132 at the 2010 census, up from 20,534 at the 2000 census. The town's population growth rate of 80.8% between 2000 and 2010 was the greatest of any town in western Anne Arundel County. Odenton is located west of Annapolis, south of Baltimore, and northeast of Washington.

In recent years, Odenton has become the fastest-growing city in the county with 2010 census numbers reporting 42% growth. This is because of its proximity to Fort George G. Meade, which contains NSA headquarters, US Cyber Command (established 2009), and the Defense Information Systems Agency (moved to Fort Meade in 2011). Odenton's growth can also be attributed to it being centrally located between Annapolis, Baltimore, and Washington, D.C. The development has been fueled by the construction of the massive Piney Orchard development, progress in the ongoing development of Odenton Town Center, and construction of the NSA East Campus Integration Program scheduled for completion in 2028.

Etymology
The town is named after former Governor of Maryland Oden Bowie. It is bordered by Gambrills to the east, Severn to the north, Fort Meade to the west, and Crofton to the south. It is located at the intersection of Maryland routes 170 and 175 and is bordered by Route 32 to the north. The zipcode is 21113.

History
In 1840, the steam-powered Annapolis and Elk Ridge Railroad (A&ER) was built across a sparsely settled farming community that would later become Odenton.  At the beginning of the Civil War, Union soldiers guarded this railroad line because it was the only link between the North and the nation's capital. Rail traffic through Baltimore had been disrupted by southern sympathizers, so supplies, mail and soldiers flowed through Annapolis and west Anne Arundel County to Washington.

The town of Odenton, nicknamed "The Town a Railroad Built" by Catherine L. O'Malley, was formed in 1868 with the construction of the Baltimore Potomac (B&P) Railroad connecting Baltimore and Washington, D.C. Where the B&P crossed the A&ER, a train station and telegraph office were constructed and named for Oden Bowie, president of the B&P and former governor of Maryland. Train service to the station began on July 2, 1872.  The rail junction (today's MARC station) at Odenton Road, already a busy thoroughfare from Annapolis to Frederick, became the site of Odenton's first commercial center. The Watts and Murray general stores served railroad workers and farmers, and in 1871 a post office was established. A town grew near the junction, houses were built for railroad workers, a Methodist church was dedicated in 1891 and a grade school opened in 1892.

Small villages developed around these various railroad lines, but none amounted to more than a cluster of shops and homes around a train station and post office. The 1878 Maryland Directory listed the following towns: Conaway, Odenton, Patuxent, Sappington, and Woodwardville. Odenton was the largest, with a population of 100, a church, a school and two stores. In nearby Woodwardville, where the B&P crossed the Little Patuxent River, A. G. Woodward was the postmaster and operated a general merchandise store in a village of 50 people. Two churches and a school served that community. Land was worth from $5 and $30 per acre, producing wheat, corn and tobacco.

Canneries, primarily for tomatoes, were built in many locations in Anne Arundel County, including Odenton and Woodwardville. The George M. Murray Canning House, built in the late 19th century on Odenton Road (behind present day 1380 and 1382 Odenton Road) was a successful operation into the early 1900s.

Shortly after 1900, another company built an electric interurban railroad parallel to the B&P and also electrified the former A&ER. Train service on these lines began in 1908. The Washington, Baltimore and Annapolis Electric Railroad provided public transportation to central Maryland.

In 1914, the United States Naval Academy purchased the  Hammond Manor Farm in neighboring Gambrills for the construction of a dairy following the 1910 typhoid fever outbreak at the Academy. The Academy operated the dairy until 1998. Until 2005 it was the home of Dean Foods' Horizon Organic dairy. The farm is currently the home of Maryland Sunrise Farm.

In 1917, at the advent of World War I, Odenton's growth was spurred by the establishment of Fort Meade. The United States Department of War acquired  of land west of Odenton to develop a training camp, displacing numerous farmers, merchants and public and private enterprises, many of whom moved east to nearby Odenton. The Epiphany Chapel and Church House at Fort Meade was listed on the National Register of Historic Places in 2001. This growth accelerated in the 1950s with the establishment of the National Security Agency on the fort and Friendship International Airport (now the Baltimore-Washington International Thurgood Marshall Airport) a few miles to the north. Odenton still maintains its railroad history through the Dennis F. Sullivan Maintenance Facility, operated by Amtrak, which maintains track, bridges and other structures on the Amtrak/MARC line between Baltimore and Washington. All of this, as well as the suburban expansion of Baltimore and Washington, D.C., have transformed Odenton from a farmland region to a business, residential and industrial center in Anne Arundel County.

Geography
Odenton is located at  (39.071276, −76.699756).

Sports

Washington Capitals Piney Orchard Ice Arena
Prior to their relocation to the Kettler Capitals Iceplex in Arlington, Virginia in 2006, the Washington Capitals ice hockey team practiced at the Piney Orchard Ice Arena.

Maryland Black Bears Piney Orchard Ice Arena
After its renovation in 2017, Piney Orchard Ice Arena now hosts the Maryland Black Bears of the North American Hockey League. Tickets for the games are available online and at the box office. The team sells merchandise such as jerseys, hats, cloths and other items.

Demographics

As of the census of 2000, there were 20,534 people, 7,594 households, and 5,551 families residing in the CDP. The racial makeup of the CDP was 80.15% White, 12.76% African American, 0.37% Native American, 3.06% Asian, 0.08% Pacific Islander, 0.98% from other races, and 2.61% from two or more races. Hispanic or Latino of any race were 2.77% of the population. As of 2010 the racial makeup of the CDP was 65.28% White, 23.02% African American, 0.4% Native American, 5.48% Asian/Pacific Islander American, 0.1% Native Hawaiian or Pacific Islander and 4.1% Two or more races. 5.9% were Hispanic or Latino of any race.

There were 7,594 households, out of which 37.7% had children under the age of 18 living with them, 58.8% were married couples living together, 10.5% had a female householder with no husband present, and 26.9% were non-families. 19.7% of all households were made up of individuals, and 4.2% had someone living alone who was 65 years of age or older. The average household size was 2.70 and the average family size was 3.13.

In the CDP, the population was spread out, with 26.9% under the age of 18, 7.0% from 18 to 24, 38.7% from 25 to 44, 20.5% from 45 to 64, and 6.8% who were 65 years of age or older. The median age was 33 years. For every 100 females, there were 94.9 males. For every 100 females age 18 and over, there were 91.7 males.

The median income for a household in the CDP was $65,563, and the median income for a family was $69,098 (these figures had risen to $85,137 and $96,641 respectively as of a 2007 estimate). Males had a median income of $45,965 versus $32,659 for females. The per capita income for the CDP was $26,124. About 1.6% of families and 2.5% of the population were below the poverty line, including 1.8% of those under age 18 and 5.2% of those age 65 or over.

In 2020, Odenton had a population of 41,846, an increase of 12.70% from the 2010 census. In 2019, the median household income for Odenton overall was $99,601, but the median household income for families was $132,787., which suggests that Odenton has a large percentage of childless singles relative to other nearby suburban areas. In 2019, the racial composition of Odenton was 62.49% white, 22.73% Black or African American, 6.53% Asian, 6.50% Two or more races, 1.65% other race, 0.08% Native American, and 0.02% Native Hawaiian or Pacific Islander. 85.11% of Odenton residents only speak English, 6.2% speak Spanish, 4% speak an Asian or Pacific Islander language, 3.4% speak other Indo-European languages, and 1.5% speak other languages.

Education

Public schools

Children in Odenton are served by the following public schools in the Anne Arundel County Public Schools district:

Elementary schools
 Crofton Woods Elementary School (Crofton)
 Four Seasons Elementary School (Gambrills)
 Odenton Elementary School
 Piney Orchard Elementary School
 Seven Oaks Elementary School
 Waugh Chapel Elementary School

Middle schools
 Arundel Middle School
 Crofton Middle School (Gambrills) 
 MacArthur Middle School (Ft. Meade)

High schools

 Arundel High School (Gambrills)
 Crofton High School (Gambrills)
 Meade High School (Fort Meade)

Private schools
 Odenton Christian School
 Annapolis Area Christian School near Severn, off of Burns Crossing Rd.
 School of the Incarnation (SOTI)

Politics
Odenton is represented in the Maryland General Assembly by legislators in Districts 21, 32 and 33. District 21 is primarily in Prince George's County. District 32 also includes Severn, Linthicum, Heights, and Glen Burnie.  District 33 also includes Severna Park, Crownsville and Crofton. Odenton is represented in District 4 of the Anne Arundel County Council.

Notable natives
Jackson Dean, country music singer
Cam Whitmore, basketball player

Neighborhoods of Odenton
 Academy Yard
 Breezewood
 Chapelgate
 Chapel Grove
 Colony Ridge
 Crawfords Ridge
 Four Seasons
 Kings Ransom
 Kings Heights
 Lions Gate
 Maple Ridge
 Odenton Gardens
 Peach Tree
 Piney Orchard
 The Groves
 Harvest Run
 Seven Oaks
 Shelter Cove
Two Rivers

References

External links

 Odenton Small Area Plan Community History

 
1868 establishments in Maryland
Census-designated places in Anne Arundel County, Maryland
Census-designated places in Maryland
Populated places established in 1868